Bert Tyrone Emanuel (born October 26, 1970) is a former American football wide receiver in the National Football League. He was drafted by the Atlanta Falcons in the second round of the 1994 NFL Draft. He played college football at Rice.

Emanuel also played for the Tampa Bay Buccaneers, Miami Dolphins, New England Patriots, and Detroit Lions.

"The Bert Emanuel Rule"
While playing for the Tampa Bay Buccaneers against the St. Louis Rams in the 1999 NFC Championship Game, Emanuel made a 13-yard reception at the Rams' 22 yard line with 47 seconds remaining in the game. The Buccaneers, trailing 11–6, called a quick timeout, and the reception would have given Tampa Bay a realistic chance to continue a potential game-winning drive. The ruling on the field initially was a complete pass. Despite the fact that Emanuel apparently controlled the ball at every point during the catch, booth replay official Jerry Markbreit ordered a review of the call. Referee Bill Carollo determined that the nose of the ball had touched the ground as he brought it into his body. The catch was overturned, and Tampa Bay went on to lose the game, 11–6.

The ensuing controversy prompted the NFL to clarify the rule regarding what constitutes a valid pass reception.  This would come to be known as "The Bert Emanuel Rule."

References

1970 births
Living people
American football wide receivers
Rice Owls football players
Atlanta Falcons players
National Football League controversies
Tampa Bay Buccaneers players
Miami Dolphins players
New England Patriots players
Detroit Lions players